The Department of Housing and Construction was an Australian government department that existed between November 1973 and December 1975.

History
The department was established while the Whitlam Government was in power. Shortly after the Fraser Government took office in November 1975 as a result of the Australian constitutional crisis, the department was abolished.

Scope
Information about the department's functions and/or government funding allocation could be found in the Administrative Arrangements Orders, the annual Portfolio Budget Statements and in the Department's annual reports.

The functions of the Department at its creation were:
Housing
Provision of hostel accommodation in the Australian Territories and for immigrants
Planning, execution and maintenance of Australian Government works 
Design, provision and maintenance of furniture, furnishings and fittings for the Australian Government
Promotion of national standards in relation to building construction

Among other activities, the Department prepared a feasibility study for the construction of Black Mountain Tower, a telecommunications tower in Canberra. The Department also undertook planning for the tower's construction.

Structure
The Department was a Commonwealth Public Service department, staffed by officials who were responsible to the Minister for Housing and Construction.

References

Housing and Construction
Ministries established in 1973